Seven and a Half Dates is a 2018 Nigerian movie directed by Biodun Stephen and produced by Toyin Abraham.

Plot 
The film gives as insight in the life of a young lady Bisola, a hard working entrepreneur who is the first born of her parent, her sister got married and she not married yet. The Dad wants her to get married as soon as possible so he sets up 10 dates for her of which she found her love.

Cast 
 Mercy Johnson
 Jim Iyke
 Akin Lewis
 Sola Sobowale
 Toyin Abraham
 Fathia Williams
 Bayray McNwizu

References 

Nigerian romantic drama films
2018 films